Dr. John S. Langford is the Founder and CEO of Electra.aero, a startup developing hybrid electric aircraft for regional mobility. He was previously Founder, President, and C.E.O. of Aurora Flight Sciences. Langford founded Aurora Flight Sciences in 1989 in order to design and manufacture high altitude UAVs that could be used for global climate change research. In 2004, Langford received Virginia’s Outstanding Industrialist award for his contribution to business development in Virginia.

Education and career
Langford received his Ph.D. from MIT in the field of aeronautics and public policy. He also received Bachelor and Master of Science degrees in aeronautics and astronautics and a Master of Science in defense policy and arms control from MIT.

While he was a student at MIT, Langford managed the MIT Daedalus human powered aircraft project.

In April 2017, John Langford was elected President of the American Institute of Aeronautics and Astronautics (AIAA).

In 2018, he was elected a member of the National Academy of Engineering for the application of autonomy and robotics to the design, development, production, and operation of advanced aircraft.

See also
Estes Industries

References

American aerospace engineers
Living people
American chief executives
MIT School of Engineering alumni
Year of birth missing (living people)